Det brinner! (It burns!) is a 1999 young adult novel written by Laura Trenter. In 2002 a TV series based on the novel was produced and released on DVD in 2004, and the appearing actors were among Sofie Hamilton, Loa Falkman, Cecilia Frode, Göran Ragnerstam and Magnus Krepper.

Plot
Frida is best friend with Christoffer, whose father is policeman. One day she becomes friend with Isabell who moves to the city, and Isabell wants her to go with her and smoke without that someone knows it, but then suddenly it burns at the deserted croft and Frida and Isabell believe that it's their fault. They promise to don't tell someone but the police find a body at the croft. What should Isabell and Frida do?

References

1999 novels
Books by Laura Trenter
Young adult novels